St. John's School (also known as St. John's or SJS) is a coeducational, independent K–12 day school in Houston, Texas, United States. The School was founded in 1946 and is a member of the Houston Area Independent Schools, the Independent Schools Association of the Southwest (ISAS), and the Southwest Preparatory Conference (SPC).  Though situated adjacent to St. John the Divine church, St. John's claims no religious affiliation. Tuition costs ranges from ~27,000 to ~32,000 dollars per school year.

As of December 2022, SJS's endowment is $86,000,000.

History

Founding
Toward the close of World War II, W. St. John Garwood and other prominent Houstonians sought to create in Houston a "school of exacting standards" in the development of individual, spiritual, ethical, intellectual, social, and physical growth of its students.  In January 1946, these Houstonians invited Alan Lake Chidsey, former headmaster of both the Pawling School (today the Trinity-Pawling School) and the Arizona Desert School and the post-war Assistant Dean of Students at the University of Chicago, to travel to Texas to speak at a gathering of interested members of the Houston community.  Mr. and Mrs. W. St. John Garwood Sr., Mr. and Mrs. Merrick Phelps, Mr. R. E. Smith, Mr. J. O. Winston Jr., and the Reverend Thomas Sumners of the Church of St. John the Divine Episcopal Church were among those present at the meeting.  At Mr. Chidsey's persuasion, Mrs. William S. Farish immediately committed to her involvement with the School, and many others followed.

A proposal was drafted that entailed combining forces with the St. John the Divine nursery school to create the School. St. John's first 344 students filed into St. John the Divine's chapel on Opening Day, September 27, 1946. The entire campus, located on what used to be Michael Louis Westheimer's farm, was six acres (2.4 ha).

The School's 41 acres includes 13 acres that were purchased in late December 2012 for approximately $90 million (the Taub Property). The School's student-teacher ratio is approximately 7:1. Despite its lack of religious affiliation, the School provides non-denominational chapel services at the church of St. John the Divine each Wednesday morning during the academic year. In recent years, the Chapel program has branched out to offer more multicultural services, hosting speakers from a diverse range of faiths and non-religious backgrounds, such as environmentalists, athletes, and faculty or student alumni.

Post-founding
In the wake of the murder of George Floyd in 2020, several St. John's alumni, several African-American and some non-African American, issued a letter to the administration to ask it to take measures against racism.

Campus

St. John's 41-acre grounds are located in the central part of Houston, Texas, specifically spanning the Upper Kirby district and the residential neighborhood of River Oaks.

The campus itself comprises two campuses, divided by Westheimer Road, that are connected by two pedestrian tunnels underneath Westheimer.  The Brown (South) Campus contains the Lower School (classes K-5) and the Georges Middle School (classes 6–8) as well as the Virginia Stuller Tatham (VST) Fine Arts Center and the Smith Athletic Center. The Cullen (North) Campus houses the Upper School (classes 9–12) and the focal point of the School, the Quadrangle. The Lower, Middle, and Upper Schools each maintain their own libraries. Upper and Middle School students share the Upper School cafeteria, and the Lower School has its own.

In addition, the school's primary athletic field, Skip Lee Field, and its track are located on the South Campus to the east of the Middle School and to the south of the Lower School. The School also owns two properties neighboring the South Campus that house athletic fields (Finnegan Field and Scotty Caven Field) for field hockey, soccer, and lacrosse.

Across Buffalo Speedway from the South Campus is the Taub Property, a 13-acre property acquired by St. John's in December 2012. The school's baseball field along with temporary offices are located on the property as of March 2015.

The William Stamps Farish Quadrangle, the first building constructed, has an exterior of Austin limestone and was designed by Hiram A. Salisbury. It was built beginning in late March 1946, with an interruption from June 13 to August 30 of that year due to a strike, with the end in March 1948. The two wings were West Farish and East Farish, the former the school's first wing and named after killed in action World War II soldier William Stamps Farish Jr., and the second named after his father, William Stamps Farish Sr. The money used to build the wings originated from the wife of Farish Sr., also the mother of Farish Jr. Due to a lack of housing in the area, initially a portion of West Farish was used as faculty apartments, but they were discontinued in 1952 and converted into offices and classrooms as additional non-school housing opened. The school announced in June 2004 that it would redevelop three sides of the Quadrangle. Leigh Cutler wrote in The Houston Review that "Although the exterior design of the new building is sympathetic to old construction, much of the original materials and limestone patterns cannot be repeated."

In late 2014 the school released its master plan for the campus that included the recently acquired Taub Property. The plan was developed with the assistance of Architectural Resources Cambridge and the input of faculty, students, and alumni.

The school is adjacent to Lamar High School, a public secondary school operated by Houston Independent School District.

Academics

College placement
Data released by the School reflects that, from 2010 to 2014, approximately 48% of St. John's seniors went on to matriculate at colleges and universities ranked by U.S. News & World Report as being in the Top 25 of National Universities or the Top 10 of Liberal Arts Colleges.

Standardized testing

Data for the Class of 2022 reflects a median SAT score of 740 (out of 800) in Reading & Writing and 760 (out of 800) in Math.  The Class of 2022's median ACT score is 34 on a 36 scale.

For years 2012 to 2015, more than half of each SJS senior class were recognized as National Merit Semifinalists or Commended Scholars: for 2012, the percentage was 68%; for 2013, 64%; for 2014, 59%; and for 2015, 64%.  Data for the 2013–2014 academic year shows that SJS led all Houston-area schools in both number (49) and percentage (35%) of National Merit Semifinalists in its senior class.

Students and faculty

Enrollment for the 2018–2019 school year is 368 for the Lower School, 361 for the Middle School, and 697 for the Upper School. Approximately 13% of students are on scholarship or financial aid. Thirty-three percent of students self-identify as being of color. There are approximately 5,862 living alumni.

The total number of faculty at SJS is 208, 131 of whom have master's or doctorate degrees.

Student life

Athletics

St. John's sponsors teams in cross-country, volleyball, field hockey, and football in the fall season; soccer, basketball, swimming, and wrestling in the winter; and golf, tennis, lacrosse, softball, baseball, and track and field in the spring.

In a tradition that began in 1951, St. John's plays its annual homecoming football game against crosstown rival The Kinkaid School at Rice Stadium.

Arts

Students can participate in the arts in classes for academic credit, performing ensembles, and extracurricular organizations or performances.

The oldest extracurricular arts organization at St. John's is Johnnycake, founded by first headmaster Alan Lake Chidsey in 1949, that originally produced and performed works written by Mr. Chidsey. Open to all Upper School students, Johnnycake provides opportunities in all aspects of theatrical production from technical crew to set and costume design to performance.

Student organizations

The SJS Academic Bowl Team won the NAQT High School National Championship in 2002, placed third in 2003 and 2004, and advanced to the semi-finals of the PACE NSC in 2004. Most recently, St. John's placed 2nd in the 2014 HSNCT National Championships

Dozens of other student organizations, from the Yearbook to Model United Nations to "Pots and Pans" (a moral/spirit group), are active throughout the academic year. Other examples of clubs include sports based clubs (baseball, hockey, soccer, curling), science (Science and Math Club, Faraday), cinematography (MavTV), academic (Speech and Debate Team, Quiz Bowl/Academic Challenge, Mathematical Problem Solving Club), government (Junior Statesmen, Model UN, Young Political Organization), international interests (Spanish Club, Italian Club, International Club), and general interests (Bread Club, Auto club, Anime Club et al.).

Community service

Community service is introduced in Lower School. Weekly canned food drives are held, and classes visit local food banks to see how their contributions are used. The annual drive to provide holiday presents to underprivileged families is a highlight of the year, culminating in a field trip to personally deliver the presents to the families.

In Middle School, additional community service projects are introduced. Students may be more involved in planning and helping with the organization of these projects. Upper School community service is mostly student-driven. Any student may submit a proposal to design and lead their own project and recruit other participants.

Nickname and mascot
The St. John's nickname and mascot have had a controversial history.  The original nickname, "Crusaders," lasted only three years due to its religious connotations.  "Rebels" was selected as the replacement nickname in 1949, with Confederate symbol Johnny Reb as the mascot.

In 1990, the Upper School students voted to discontinue the mascot and nickname.  A year later, all symbols of the Confederacy were disassociated from the School, although the nickname "Rebels" was retained with the hopes it could be connected with the American Revolution or more generally as an invocation of nonconformity and independent thinking. There were plans to try to connect the rebel name with the film Rebel Without a Cause.

In the spring of 2004, by a unanimous vote of the Board of Trustees, St. John's School officially changed its nickname to Mavericks in order to further distance itself from any Confederate implications while still retaining the association with independence and individualism. The change was supported by a majority of faculty, though some students and alumni opposed the change. Today, the Maverick nickname is widely used and accepted,.

In 2008, St. John's began using a horse mascot known as Maverick in its pep rallies. In a school-wide pep rally, taking place the day before the annual Kinkaid football game, the Maverick chases a Falcon from the field.

In the media and popular culture

News stories
National media reports about selective private schools in the United States have mentioned St. John's. For example, SJS was featured in a Forbes.com story titled "America's Elite Prep Schools."  In November 2007, the Wall Street Journal listed St. John's in a chart accompanying an article titled "How to Get into Harvard." The chart reported that 9% of SJS graduates in 2007 went to one of eight elite colleges (specifically identified as Harvard, Princeton, MIT, Williams, Pomona, Swarthmore, the University of Chicago, and Johns Hopkins).  St. John's and fellow SPC member St. Mark's School of Texas were the only Texas schools on the list.

Nationwide rankings of private high schools regularly include St. John's, with recent rankings as follows:

 No. 18 - Best Private K–12 Schools in America, Niche.com (2019–20)
 No. 23 - Top 25 Private High Schools in the Country, Town & Country (2016)
 No. 7 - The 50 Smartest High Schools in the U.S., Business Insider (2016)

St. John's received media attention during the U.S. presidential campaign of 2000 as part of the press's reporting on the academic background of then-candidate George W. Bush when it was reported—and confirmed by Bush after he had consulted with his parents, former President George H. W. Bush and First Lady Barbara Bush—that he had applied to SJS as a child and had been rejected.

Rushmore
In 1998, Wes Anderson '87 directed the loosely autobiographical Rushmore, based on a screenplay co-written with Owen Wilson. In directing the film, Anderson based the fictitious Rushmore Academy on St. John's. As reported in The Atlantic, "When Wes Anderson scouted locations for the all-boys prep school..., he looked as far as the U.K. in search of the perfect location. It wasn't until he saw some photos of St. John's, his own high school, that he realized the places he had been imagining were the ones he knew from going to school there."  Like protagonist Max Fischer, Anderson as a child had staged numerous epic action plays, with titles like The Five Maseratis and The Battle of the Alamo.  Seen in Rushmore are the North Campus's Quadrangle and circle driveway, the Upper School library, and chapel service at the Church of St. John the Divine.  Anderson also used a number of students and alumni as extras in the film.

Clinger
Much of the 2015 horror comedy Clinger, directed by Michael Steves, was filmed on the middle school campus at St. John's. Clinger premiered at the 2015 Slamdance Film Festival in Park City, Utah. It was announced during July that Clinger would premiere in theaters in October.

The Dropout
In the drama miniseries The Dropout, a young Elizabeth Holmes is portrayed as attending SJS as a Middle School student in 1995 and as an Upper School student in 2001.

Notable alumni

 Wes Anderson (1987), writer, film director
 William Curtis Bryson (1963), Jurist, Senior United States Circuit Judge of the United States Court of Appeals for the Federal Circuit
 Katherine Center (1990), New York Times bestselling author
 William Stamps Farish III (1957), former U.S. Ambassador to the United Kingdom
 Lizzie Pannill Fletcher (1993), United States Representative (D-TX)
 Christy Haubegger (1986), founder of Latina magazine and film producer
 Elizabeth Holmes (2002), founder of health technology company Theranos, convicted in 2022 of defrauding investors
 Sarah Blaffer Hrdy (1964), anthropologist
 Wesley Hunt (2000), United States Representative-Elect (Republican, Texas)
 Molly Ivins (1962), journalist and pundit (who described herself as feeling like a "Clydesdale among thoroughbreds" in comparing herself to her fellow students at SJS)
 Ken Keeler (1979), mathematician and television writer, Late Show with David Letterman, The Simpsons, and Futurama
 Benjamin Moser (1994), Pulitzer Prize-winning author
Laura Moser (1995), author and political activist
Indy Neidell (1985), historian, host of The Great War
 Peter Roussel (1960), former deputy press secretary to U.S. President Ronald Reagan and media commentator
 Sidney Shlenker, businessman
 Ashlee Vance (1996), business journalist, author
 Carl W. Vogt (1954), 15th President of Williams College  
 Justise Winslow (2014), professional basketball player for the NBA's Portland Trail Blazers

Heads of School
Alan Lake Chidsey, 1946–1966
Elwood Kimball Salls, 1966–1976
Thomas Read, 1976–1981
James R. Maggart, 1981–1991
E. Philip Cannon, 1991–1998 (1991–1992 as interim headmaster)
John Allman, 1998–2009 (followed by interim headmaster Jim Hendrix, 2009–2010)
Mark Desjardins, 2010–2021
Daniel J. Alig, 2021–present

References
  - Profile

Notes

External links

 
History of SJS
Satellite photo of campus

Private K-12 schools in Houston
Independent Schools Association of the Southwest
Educational institutions established in 1946
1946 establishments in Texas
River Oaks, Houston